Stuart Lyons (1928 in Manchester, England – 23 February 1998) was a British film producer.

Producer 
Something to Believe In (1998) (line producer)
Meetings with Remarkable Men (1979)
The Slipper and the Rose (1976)

Casting director
The Blue Max (1966)
Those Magnificent Men in Their Flying Machines (1965)
Guns at Batasi (1964)
The Damned (1963)
Pirates of Blood River (1962)
The Curse of the Werewolf (1961)
Shadow of the Cat (1961)
Taste of Fear (1961) aka Scream of Fear (US)
Sword of Sherwood Forest (1960)

External links 

British film producers
1928 births
1998 deaths
Mass media people from Manchester